The X-Files: I Want to Believe – Original Motion Picture Soundtrack is an original film score composed and performed by Mark Snow for the motion picture The X-Files: I Want to Believe. It contains a remixed version of the theme tune by Unkle and one hip hop version by Xzibit.

Track listing 
The soundtrack to The X-Files: I Want to Believe – Original Motion Picture Soundtrack was released on July 22, 2008.

Trust No One Documentary 
In the documentary included in the "Ultimate X-Phile Edition" of The X-Files: I Want To Believe DVD, it shows that some of the unusual sounds were created by a variation of silly putty and dimes tucked in between and over the strings of the piano.

Mark Snow also comments that the fast percussion featured in some tracks was inspired by the track 'Prospectors Quartet' from the There Will Be Blood soundtrack.

External links 
Soundtrack listing on Amazon.com

Film scores
The X-Files music
Mark Snow albums
2008 soundtrack albums
Thriller film soundtracks